Clunes is a town in Victoria, Australia, 36 kilometres north of Ballarat, in the Shire of Hepburn. At the 2016 census it had a population of 1,728.

History

Pre-colonial
The Djadja Wurrung people were the first inhabitants of the region including the settlement which later became Clunes.

Frontier war 
In December 1839, a group of Aboriginal men were given a mixture of plaster of Paris and flour by the cook of Glengower Station in an effort to poison them. In retaliation, the cook was speared to death, resulting in the Blood Hole massacre in which between six and ten Aboriginal people were killed.

The Aboriginal people sought safety by diving into the waterhole and there they were shot, one at a time, as they came up for air. The place is still known as 'the Blood-Hole'.

Discovery of gold

The town was home to Victoria's first registered gold discovery made by William Campbell in 1850. This discovery was not made public until 1851. In 1851 German Herman Brunn visited the site of Campbell's discovery on Donald Cameron's run the 'Clunes'. He then traveled the area informing all he met of the find on Cameron's run 'Clunes'. He told James Esmond who traveled to Clunes and inspected the site and collected a gold sample which he took to gold assayer in Geelong on 7 July 1851. He also informed Arthur Clark editor of the Geelong Advertiser, requesting that nothing would be said until he returned from Melbourne with equipment. In August 1851 a Mr. Davies from Avoca revealed in the Geelong Advertiser that the site was at Clunes. William Campbell's announcement in Melbourne and Davies news item triggered the gold rush in Victoria. The township was established a few years later and subsequent gold mining predominantly driven by the Port Phillip and Colonial Mining Company which was mining the site of the discovery saw the town's population rising to well over 6,000 residents in the late 1880s.

Clunes post office opened as early as 1 October 1857 and in 1874 Clunes was connected to the Victorian railway network. Clunes station was opened in the same year.

In 1873 mine employers attempted to introduce Saturday afternoon and Sunday shifts. The miners refused to sign the new terms outlined in their contract renewals and went on a strike that lasted 3 months. Some days into the action the miners organised the Clunes Miners' Association and what were to become known as the Clunes riots, successfully resisting the use of Chinese labour from Creswick as strikebreakers.

From the 1850s through to 1893, when gold mining eventually came to an end, Clunes was an important gold production location in Victoria. Surrounded by grassland, meadows and pastures, the town has preserved many of its elegant historic buildings until today and is recognised as one of the architecturally most-intact gold towns in Victoria.

Twentieth century

The Clunes Magistrates' Court closed on 1 January 1983.
The original Mad Max was partly filmed there.

Notable residents 
 Jean Beadle (1868–1942) – labour leader, feminist and social worker
 Rivett Henry Bland (1811–1894) – manager of the Port Phillip and Colonial Gold Mining Company from 1852 and the Clunes Quartz Mining Company who oversaw the development and success of the mine.
Nancy Jobson (1880–1964) – headmistress
Robert (Bob) Lewis (1878–1947) – jockey
Sir John Longstaff (1861–1941) – artist
Harley Tarrant (1860–1949) – businessman
Nick Hind (b. 1994) – AFL player

Present

International Booktown

Concept
The idea of transforming Clunes into a European-style booktown was first conceived and developed by Councillor Tim Hayes, Linda Newitt, Graeme Johnston and Tess Brady. Clunes held its first 'Booktown for a Day' event on 20 May 2007. Over 50 booksellers from around Australia set up shop for the day in the town's heritage buildings.

Renamed to 'Back to Booktown' a year later and to 'Clunes Booktown Festival' in 2012, the township now holds the event each year on the first weekend in May. It has become the largest collection of books in any regional centre of Australia and the major Victorian regional book event.

Awards and recognition
 In 2008 'Back to Booktown' won Hepburn Shire's Community Event of the Year.
 On 21 January 2010 the Hon. John Brumby, Premier of Victoria, said during the Australia Day Luncheon: 'In Victoria we even have our very own booktown. The regional community of Clunes in north-west Victoria sees its future as a cultural destination centred around literature. As well as their successful 'Back to Booktown' festival, just last month our Government helped launch the new Creative Clunes Community Bookshop.'
 On 23 November 2010 'Clunes - Back to Booktown' was awarded the Australian Civic Trust 'Award of Merit' in the Human Category for its use of heritage buildings in a 'respectful, as against destructive use.'
 On 19 April 2012 Clunes was given 'International Booktown' status—a title awarded to the town by the 'International Organisation of Booktowns'. Clunes is the first town in the Southern Hemisphere and the 15th town world-wide to have received the official recognition.
 The Australia Day awards for 2013 for Hepburn Shire's Community Event of the Year were awarded to 'Children's Booktown 2012'.

Wesley College campus (Wesley@Clunes) 
In recent years Clunes has undergone a noticeable transformation and rejuvenation following the decision by Wesley College, Australia's largest co-educational private school, to establish a campus for Year 9 students in the town. Opened in 2000, about 80 students take up residency in the Wesley Clunes Residential Learning Village in the centre of town and become part of the local community for an eight-week period each term. Where they learn how to live in a shared house and how to live with others when they grow up.

Film 
Many of the external scenes and some internal scenes in the 2003 film Ned Kelly, starring Heath Ledger, were shot in Clunes. The Old State Bank in Fraser Street was used for the internal scenes featuring the "Euroa" bank robbery.

Clunes also appears in the films Mad Max starring Mel Gibson, as the town the Toe Cutters gang arrive at to collect the Night Riders body, and the remake of the 1950s classic On the Beach. It also appears in the ABC television series' Queen Kat, Carmel & St Jude, Something in the Air and Halifax f.p..

Clunes was once closed off to the public for the TV show The Mole in 2001. The mission in that episode was to direct one of the contestants to pick up another contestant in a blacked-out car.

More recently Clunes has been used for movies and TV shows such as:

 Tomorrow, When the War Began aired on ABC3 in early 2016.
 Much of the series finale of the HBO show The Leftovers was filmed in Clunes.
 The Picnic at Hanging Rock 2018 remake filmed exterior scenes in the Clunes main street.
 The Stan series Bloom used Clunes as its central township.

as well as some scenes for the True History of the Kelly Gang.

One short film shot in Clunes is Julius Avery's 13-minute movie Jerrycan. Jerrycan won the 2008 Jury Prize at the 61st Cannes Film Festival in France for short films, with its portrayal of restless teenagers in rural Victoria.

Sport 

The town's Australian rules football/netball team is the Clunes Magpies, competing in the Central Highlands Football League and Central Highlands Netball League.

Golfers play at the Clunes Golf Club on Golf Course Road.

 Clunes has a cricket club playing in the Maryborough District Cricket Association.
 Clunes has a lawn bowls club that competes in the Ballarat District Bowls Division.

Transport
Clunes railway station is located on the Mildura line.

When the State Government announced the Victorian Transport Plan, along with V/Line services being extended to Maryborough, Clunes was not part of the plan (with the only stations being Creswick and Maryborough). However, as a result of protest by the town, the Government announced on 17 June 2010 that Clunes would be reopened and included on the line.

References

External links

Class and racism in the 1873 Clunes Riot
Clunes tourism information
Clunes community website
Wesley College - Clunes campus webpages
Clunes Football Netball Club

Mining towns in Victoria (Australia)
1850s establishments in Australia